The Nigerian National Assembly delegation from Sokoto comprises three Senators representing Sokoto North, Sokoto East, and Sokoto West, and eleven Representatives representing   Sokoto North/Sokoto South, Binji/Silame, Wurno/Rabah, Isa-Sabon-Birni, Gwadaba/Illiza, Kware/Wamakko, Gudu/Tangaza, Kebbe/Tambuwal, Gorondo/Gada, Bodinga/Dange-Shuni/Tureta, and Shagari/Yabo.

Fourth Republic

9th Assembly (2019-2023)

The 4th Parliament (1999 - 2003)

References
Official Website - National Assembly Senators (Sokoto State)
Official Website - National Assembly House of Representatives (Sokoto State)
 Senator List

Sokoto State
National Assembly (Nigeria) delegations by state